Mecyclothorax peryphoides is a species of ground beetle in the subfamily Psydrinae. It was described by Blackburn in 1889.

References

peryphoides
Beetles described in 1889